Whatever Love Means is a television film about Camilla Parker Bowles and Prince Charles. Directed by David Blair and starring Olivia Poulet and Laurence Fox, it premiered in December 2005 on ITV1. The story centres on Charles and Camilla's relationship in the early 1970s until 1981.

Plot
In 1971, Camilla Shand (Olivia Poulet) meets Charles, Prince of Wales (Laurence Fox) at a polo match. They get to know each other and begin dating. The relationship fizzles out when Charles travels overseas to join the Royal Navy in early 1973. Camilla immediately marries her ex-boyfriend Andrew Parker Bowles (Simon Wilson). Though Charles is hurt upon hearing about her marriage, they remain friends. Throughout their friendship Charles and Camilla hide their feelings for each other until 1979 when Lord Mountbatten (Richard Johnson) is murdered and Charles visits her more for emotional support. They re-ignite their romantic relationship during this period. Charles is now in his early 30s and his family and the British media begins calling him out to find a suitable bride. He meets Lady Diana Spencer (Michelle Duncan) who the media falls in love with and they eventually get engaged. Although everyone is happy Charles is about to settle down, Charles and Camilla are not due to their feelings for each other, however, they end their relationship. The story ends with Charles and Camilla getting ready for his wedding in 1981, both looking grim while dressing up for the occasion.

Cast
 Laurence Fox as Charles, Prince of Wales
 Olivia Poulet as Camilla Parker Bowles
 Michelle Duncan as Lady Diana Spencer
 Alexandra Moen as Princess Anne
 Simon Wilson as Andrew Parker Bowles
 Richard Johnson as Lord Mountbatten

See also
"How Do You Solve a Problem Like Camilla?"

References

External links
 

Camilla, Queen Consort
Cultural depictions of Charles III
Cultural depictions of Diana, Princess of Wales
2005 television films
2005 films
British television films
Biographical films about British royalty
Films about nobility
Cultural depictions of Louis Mountbatten, 1st Earl Mountbatten of Burma
Films directed by David Blair (director)
2000s English-language films